Giovanni da Oriolo (active 1439; died by 1474) was an Italian painter of the Quattrocento, active in Northern Italy, including Faenza.

Only one confirmed painting by the artist is known: the profile portrait of Leonello d'Este, painted c. 1447, and now in the National Gallery of Art in London.

References

External links 

 - the National Gallery's article on the painter.

15th-century Italian painters
Quattrocento painters
Italian male painters